Church Street Historic District may refer to:

 Old Main and Church Street Historic District, Auburn, Alabama, listed on the National Register of Historic Places (NRHP) in Lee County, Alabama
 Church Street East Historic District (Mobile, Alabama), listed on the NRHP in Alabama
 Church Street Historic District (Wilmington, Delaware)
 Church Street Historic District (Dade City, Florida), listed on the NRHP
 Walton Street-Church Street Historic District, Baconton, Georgia, listed on the NRHP
 Church Street-Cherokee Street Historic District, Marietta, Georgia, listed on the NRHP in Georgia
 East Church Street Historic District, Monroe, Georgia, listed on the NRHP in Georgia
 Athens-Candler-Church Street Historic District, Winder, Georgia, listed on the NRHP in Georgia
 Church Street Historic District (Belfast, Maine), listed on the NRHP
 Church Street Historic District (North Adams, Massachusetts), listed on the NRHP
 Church Street-Caddy Hill Historic District, North Adams, Massachusetts, listed on the NRHP
 Church Street Historic District (Ware, Massachusetts), listed on the NRHP
 Church Street Historic District (Wilmington, Massachusetts), listed on the NRHP
 Broad Street-Church Street Historic District, Columbia, Mississippi, listed on the NRHP in Mississippi
 South Church Street Historic District (Tupelo, Mississippi), listed on the NRHP in Mississippi
 Church Street Commercial District (Ferguson, Missouri), listed on the NRHP in Missouri
 Church Street-Congress Street Historic District, Moravia, New York, listed on the NRHP
 Church Street Historic District (Nassau, New York), listed on the NRHP
 Church Street Row, Poughkeepsie, New York, listed on the NRHP
 Church Street Historic District (Richfield Springs, New York), listed on the NRHP
 Church Street Historic District (Saranac Lake, New York), listed on the NRHP
 Church Street Historic District (Batesburg-Leesville, South Carolina), listed on the NRHP
 East Richland Street-East Church Street Historic District, Kershaw, South Carolina, listed on the NRHP
 Church Street Historic District (Leesville, South Carolina), listed on the NRHP in South Carolina
 South Street-South Church Street Historic District, Union, South Carolina, listed on the NRHP
 Church Street Historic District (Paris, Texas), listed on the NRHP in Texas
 Church Street Historic District (Burlington, Vermont), listed on the NRHP
 Head of Church Street Historic District, Burlington, Vermont, listed on the NRHP
 East Church Street-Starling Avenue Historic District, Martinsville, VIrginia, listed on the NRHP
 South Church Street Historic District (Lewisburg, West Virginia), listed on the NRHP
 Church Street Historic District (Wauwatosa, Wisconsin), listed on the NRHP

See also
Church Street (disambiguation)